The St. Louis Blues are an American professional ice hockey team based in St. Louis, Missouri. They play in the Central Division of the Western Conference in the National Hockey League (NHL). The team joined the NHL in 1967 as an expansion team with five other teams. The Blues first played their home games at the St. Louis Arena until 1994; they have played their home games at the Enterprise Center, first named the Kiel Center, since then. The majority of the Blues franchise are owned by SLB Acquisition LLC, headed by Tom Stillman; Doug Armstrong is their general manager, and Ryan O'Reilly  is the team captain.

There have been 26 head coaches for the Blues. The franchise's first head coach was Lynn Patrick, who coached for 16 games in his first term. Joel Quenneville is the franchise's all-time leader for the most regular-season games coached (593), the most regular-season game wins (307), the most regular-season points (709), the most playoff games coached (68), and the most playoff-game wins (34). Barclay Plager and Bob Plager are the only pair of brothers to have coached the Blues; Barclay coached for four seasons, and Bob coached for eleven games. Red Berenson, Brian Sutter, Quenneville and Ken Hitchcock are the only head coaches to have been awarded the Jack Adams Award with the Blues. Scotty Bowman, Al Arbour, and Emile Francis are the only Blues head coaches to have been elected to the Hockey Hall of Fame as a builder. Five coaches have spent their entire NHL head coaching careers with the Blues. Andy Murray was the head coach of the Blues from the 2006–07 season until January 2, 2010 after 40 games (17-17-6) in the 2009-10 season until relieved in favor of Davis Payne. Payne was announced as the 23rd head coach on April 14, 2010. Payne was relieved of duties on November 6, 2011, and replaced by Ken Hitchcock who was himself replaced in 2017 by Mike Yeo.

Key

Coaches

Note: Statistics are correct through the end of the 2020–21 regular season.

Notes
 A running total of the number of coaches of the Blues. Thus, any coach who has two or more separate terms as head coach is only counted once.
 Before the 2005–06 season, the NHL instituted a penalty shootout for regular season games that remained tied after a five-minute overtime period, which prevented ties.
 Each year is linked to an article about that particular NHL season.

References

General

Specific

 
St. Louis Blues head coaches
Head coaches